Elymnias malelas, the spotted palmfly, is a butterfly in the family Nymphalidae. It was described by William Chapman Hewitson in 1863. It is found in northern India and Indochina in the Indomalayan realm.

Subspecies
E. m. malelas (northern India, Sikkim)
E. m. ivena Fruhstorfer, 1911 (southern Yunnan, Thailand, Vietnam)

Biology
Larvae feed on Trachycarpus fortunei and Musa paradisiaca. The butterfly mimics Euploea mulciber.

References

External links
"Elymnias Hübner, 1818" at Markku Savela's Lepidoptera and Some Other Life Forms

Elymnias
Butterflies described in 1863
Butterflies of Asia
Taxa named by William Chapman Hewitson